Real Burgos Club de Fútbol was a Spanish football team based in Burgos, in the autonomous community of Castile and León. Founded in 1983, it ceased to compete in 1996 and returned in 2011, holding home games at Complejo Deportivo San Amaro, with a capacity of 1,000 spectators.

The team's greatest success in its short history came in 1990, when they managed to promote to La Liga for the first time. Their spell in the top tier lasted three seasons, ending with relegation in 1993.

History
Burgos CF was founded in 1936, also known as Gimnástica Burgalesa Club de Fútbol. In 1983, the club disappeared due to serious economic problems and the reserve team, Burgos Promesas, was renamed Real Burgos Club de Fútbol.

1990 proved to be a historic year for Real Burgos. In the 1989–90 Segunda Division season, Real Burgos managed to finish in first place and promote to La Liga for the first time, just seven years after its foundation as a professional club. In its first season in the top tier, Real Burgos surprised many by finishing in the 11th place, with 37 points and a positive goal difference of +5. The team even managed to steal points from the best in the league, by beating Real Madrid at home 2–1, and drawing against Barcelona away 0-0. The following season was even more successful for Real Burgos, as they managed to finish in the ninth place, with 37 points again. Burgos again showed skills against Barcelona, managing two draws against the eventual champions. This was the golden era of the club, as it received the nickname of Matagigantes (Killers of giants), as the club defeated Real Madrid and earned points away against Barcelona and Atlético Madrid. The third season in La Liga, however, was a failure as Real Burgos eventually finished last, with only four wins in the entire season, and collecting only 22 points.

In 1994, Real Burgos was relegated to the fourth tier due to the debts owed to its players. It did not enter any competition for the 1994–95 season, being readmitted in the league for the 1995–96 season. After this season, the club definitively ceased in activity until 2011, when Real Burgos returned to competition, taking part in the Provincial League of Burgos.

Six years later, in April 2017, the club was promoted to Tercera División where it played 21 years after the last time. However, the club could not avoid relegation in its comeback season.

In 2018, Real Burgos sued the Castile and León Football Federation, claiming a place in Tercera División alleging irregularities in the announcement of the fixtures during the last rounds of the 2017–18 season. Finally, the place was not given and Real Burgos did not enter any competition as they were later expelled from the Regional Preferente. In May 2019, the judge of a court in Majadahonda ordered the club's reinstatement in the Tercera División.

Background
Burgos Promesas CF - (1970–1983) (reserve team of Burgos CF (I))
Real Burgos CF - (1983–present)

Season to season

3 seasons in La Liga
4 seasons in Segunda División
2 seasons in Segunda División B
6 seasons in Tercera División

Detailed list of seasons

Selected former players

 
 Gavril Balint
 Ivica Barbarić
 Predrag Jurić
 Zsolt Limperger
 Agustín Elduayen
 Loren
 Javier Olaizola

References

External links
Official website
Real Burgos forum 

Football clubs in Castile and León
Association football clubs established in 1983
Divisiones Regionales de Fútbol clubs
1983 establishments in Spain
Sport in Burgos
Segunda División clubs